The Bühler is a river in Baden-Württemberg, Germany. It flows into the Kocher near Braunsbach.

Tributaries

The following rivers are tributaries to the river Bühler (from source to mouth):

Left: Klingenbach, Schleifseebach, Fischach, Schießbach, Riedbach, Steinbach, Hirtenbach, Schwarzenlachenbach, Otterbach
Right: Gruppenbach, Avenbach, Elsäßerbach, Dammbach, Nesselbach, Lanzenbach, Aalenbach, Schmerach

See also
List of rivers of Baden-Württemberg

References

Rivers of Baden-Württemberg
Rivers of Germany